Koltsovo is a rural locality (a selo) in Lobanovskoye Rural Settlement, Permsky District, Perm Krai, Russia. The population was 104 in 2010. There are nine streets.

Geography 
Koltsovo is located 30 km southeast of Perm (the district's administrative centre) by road. Klyuchi is the nearest rural locality.

References 

Rural localities in Permsky District